David Michael Harwood (born June 30, 1984) is an American professional wrestler. He is currently signed to All Elite Wrestling (AEW) under the ring name Dax Harwood, where he and his FTR tag team partner, Cash Wheeler, he also makes appearances in their sister promotion Ring of Honor, as well as partner promotions Lucha Libre AAA Worldwide and New Japan Pro-Wrestling. Harwood is also known for his time in WWE, under the ring name Scott Dawson. In WWE he held both the Raw and SmackDown as well as the NXT Tag Team Championship and WWE 24/7 Championship along with Wheeler (then known as "Dash Wilder").

Professional wrestling career

Independent circuit (2004–2012)
Harwood made his professional wrestling debut in 2004. He wrestled for a variety of independent promotions as KC McKnight, most notably for CWF Mid-Atlantic, AWA Superstars of Wrestling and a number of NWA-affiliated organizations including NWA Anarchy and Pro Wrestling Zero1. In 2010, he made an appearance for Ring of Honor (ROH) in a dark match prior to ROH The Big Bang!. He also wrestled at various North Carolina independents including United Professional Wrestling Association in Wilmington, working with the likes of Zane and Dave Dawson, Daniel Messina, Charlie Dreamer, Marcus Shields, etc.

WWE (2012–2020)

Early NXT appearances (2012–2014)
Harwood signed with WWE in 2012 and was assigned to the WWE Performance Center, taking the ring name Scott Dawson. He made his television debut on March 7, 2013 episode of NXT, teaming with Judas Devlin in a two-on-one handicap loss to Adrian Neville. Dawson made a further appearance in an enhancement role on April 10 episode of NXT, in a six-man tag-team defeat against The Shield.

In May 2013, Dawson formed a tag-team with Garrett Dylan, with the two managed by Sylvester Lefort. On June 26 episode of NXT Dawson and Dylan lost a number one contender's match for the NXT Tag Team Championship to Corey Graves and Kassius Ohno. The team disbanded shortly afterwards when Dylan was released from the company. Following Dylan's release, Dawson initially worked as a singles competitor with little success and then formed a tag-team with Alexander Rusev, who was also being managed by Lefort. Rusev and Dawson participated unsuccessfully in a contendership battle royal for the NXT Tag Team Championship on September 12 episode of NXT. Their alliance ended when Rusev turned on Lefort in favor of being managed by Lana, and shortly afterwards Dawson suffered a torn anterior cruciate ligament which ruled him out of action for several months.

The Revival (2014–2020)

On his return from injury, Dawson formed a team with Dash Wilder, with the two performing extensively at live events under the name The Mechanics. The duo made their debut on July 31, 2014 episode of NXT, losing to the team of Bull Dempsey and Mojo Rawley. The duo made only one further televised appearance in 2014, losing to Enzo Amore and Colin Cassady on October 23 episode of NXT, but continued to wrestle extensively at house shows. On the June 10, 2015 episode of NXT, Dawson faced Samoa Joe in a losing effort during the show's main event.

Dawson and Wilder's team resurfaced and picked up their first televised win on the July 29, 2015 episode of NXT, defeating Amore and Cassady. The duo were involved in an 8-man tag-team match that was taped prior to NXT TakeOver: Brooklyn. At NXT TakeOver: Respect, Dawson and Wilder were defeated in the semi-finals of the Dusty Rhodes Tag Team Classic by eventual winners Finn Bálor and Samoa Joe. On the October 21 episode of NXT, The Mechanics'  ring name was changed to Dash and Dawson. On the November 11 episode of NXT, Dawson and Wilder defeated the Vaudevillains to win the NXT Tag Team Championship. They subsequently defended the titles against Enzo Amore and Colin Cassady at NXT TakeOver: London. Beginning in February 2016, the duo began performing under the team name The Revival. Dawson made his WWE main roster debut alongside Wilder at Roadblock, once again defending their NXT Tag Team Championships against Amore and Cassady. On April 1 at NXT TakeOver: Dallas, The Revival lost the NXT Tag Team Championship to American Alpha (Chad Gable and Jason Jordan) but the two won back the titles from American Alpha two months later at NXT TakeOver: The End. At NXT TakeOver: Brooklyn II, The Revival retained the titles against Johnny Gargano and Tommaso Ciampa. On November 19, 2016 at NXT TakeOver: Toronto The Revival lost the tag team titles in a two out of three falls match to #DIY (Tommaso Ciampa and Johnny Gargano). They failed in their attempt at winning back the titles at NXT TakeOver: Orlando on April 1, 2017; in a triple threat tag team elimination match.

On the Raw after WrestleMania 33 April 3 episode of Raw, The Revival answered an open challenge issued by The New Day. The Revival defeated The New Day, and afterwards attacked Kofi Kingston, who was not participating in the match. The team was on hiatus due to Wilder's injury. Wilder returned seven weeks later on the May 22, 2017 episode of Raw, walking backstage during the sneak attack on Enzo Amore, Big Cass would later accuse both Wilder and Dawson as the attackers, but they denied this. Two weeks later, on the Raw after Extreme Rules, The Revival also denied their involvement during the sneak attack on Cass, bringing out another suspect in Big Show.

The June 19, 2017 episode of Raw revealed that The Revival had nothing to do with the attack and that Cass was never attacked. Corey Graves finally came to the conclusion that Cass was indeed the culprit behind Enzo's sneak attack after The Revival stated their alibi of being innocent. Wilder returned to in ring competition on the June 26 taping of Main Event aired on June 30, teaming with Dawson to defeat Karl Anderson and Luke Gallows by pinfall, Dawson would have his first pinfall loss to Kalisto the following week.

On August 7, 2017, WWE announced that over the weekend of August 5–6 at a live event in Canada, Dawson suffered an injury to his right bicep in a match against Cesaro and Sheamus. He was out of action for 5 to 6 months. Dawson returned on the December 18 episode of Raw with Wilder to defeat Heath Slater and Rhyno. The Revival participated in the Raw Tag Team Eliminator tournament to crown new champions, but lost in the semi-finals to Matt Hardy and Bray Wyatt. At SummerSlam 2018 Pre-show, The Revival lost to Bo Dallas and Curtis Axel in an attempt to become the new Raw Tag Team champions. At Survivor Series, they were part of Team Raw, but lost to Team SmackDown in the 10-on-10 Survivor Series tag team elimination match.

Following this they began a feud against Lucha House Party and suffered various losses in handicap matches. On the December 17, 2018 episode of Raw, they defeated Lucha House Party, The B-Team and AOP in a Fatal 4-Way Match receiving a title shot for the Raw Tag Team Titles. During the next two Raw episodes they challenged Bobby Roode and Chad Gable for the titles but Dawson and Wilder were unsuccessful to win the matches in controversial fashion.

Dave Meltzer of The Wrestling Observer reported that the duo asked for their release from their WWE contracts following their match against Lucha House Party on the January 14, 2019 episode of Raw. On the February 11, 2019 episode of Raw, Dawson and Wilder defeated the team of Roode and Gable to win the Raw Tag Team Championships. They lost their titles at WrestleMania 35 to the team of Zack Ryder and Curt Hawkins. On the August 12, 2019 during a scheduled tag team match at Raw episode post-SummerSlam in which The Revival were facing Lucha House Party (Lince Dorado and Gran Metalik, with Kalisto), R-Truth ran out from backstage, being chased by several wrestlers. The match was called off and The Revival performed a "Hart Attack" on Truth and simultaneously pinned him to become the first co-champions of the 24/7 Championship. Moments later, R-Truth pinned Dawson, with the help of Carmella, and regained the title.
 The Revival began to align themselves with Randy Orton in a feud against The New Day. On September 15 at Clash of Champions, The Revival defeated Xavier Woods and Big E for the SmackDown Tag Team Championship, making them the first team to hold the Raw Tag Team Championship, SmackDown Tag Team Championship, and NXT Tag Team Championship. The Revival was drafted to SmackDown as part of the 2019 WWE Draft. On April 10, 2020, both Dawson and his tag team partner Dash Wilder were released from their WWE contracts.

All Elite Wrestling (2020–present) 

After leaving WWE, Dawson (now known as Dax Harwood) and Wilder (now known as Cash Wheeler) adopted the new name of FTR and appearing at All Elite Wrestling (AEW) shows. They debuted on the May 27, 2020 episode of AEW Dynamite, attacking The Butcher and The Blade. In July 2020, after appearing on AEW television programming for two months despite not being under contract with the company, Harwood and Wheeler signed multi-year contracts with AEW. In November 2020, Harwood and Wheeler revealed in an interview with Talk Sport journalist Alex McCarthy that they wanted to join AEW, despite being offered a huge amount of money to stay in the WWE, because they kept getting pulled from main roster events in the WWE, with Harwood stating "We knew it was time for us to move on because money is great, and I am so fortunate and lucky to take care of my beautiful wife and perfect little six year old daughter because of professional wrestling, but that’s what it’s because of – professional wrestling."

Other media
Harwood made his video game debut as a playable character in WWE 2K17, and has since appeared in WWE 2K18, WWE 2K19, and WWE 2K20.

Personal life
Harwood has been married to Maria Nickopoulos since 2012. Together, they have a daughter, Finley Gray (born 2014). Harwood is a Christian.

He played college football at East Carolina University before transferring to the University of North Carolina at Wilmington and getting a degree in business communication. His family's home in Whiteville, North Carolina was severely damaged by Hurricane Florence.

Harwood stated in a May 2020 interview that, out of all his matches up to this point in time, his all-time favorite was a two-out-of-three falls match between The Revival and American Alpha which took place during a live event, while his favorite on-screen match was The Revival's two-out-of-three falls match against DIY at NXT TakeOver: Toronto in 2016, stating "In WWE, that'll be our legacy. I'm very very proud of that match." In a November 7, 2020 interview, Harwood described FTR's upcoming match with The Young Bucks at Full Gear as a "dream match," stating "When you go around calling yourself the best tag team of the generation, you cannot get too much more pressure than that. So, this match, to a lot of people, it is a dream match and it is a match we are excited about." On November 11, 2020, four days after Full Gear, Harwood released a statement on his Twitter page expressing great praise for this match with the Young Bucks and hoped for a rematch. On April 4, 2022, Harwood stated on Twitter that their match with The Briscoe Brothers at Supercard of Honor  was the best match of FTR's career, also describing it as "their masterpiece".

Championships and accomplishments 

 All Elite Wrestling
 AEW World Tag Team Championship (1 time) – with Cash Wheeler
 The Baltimore Sun
 WWE Tag Team of the Year (2016) – with Dash Wilder
 Lucha Libre AAA Worldwide
 AAA World Tag Team Championship (1 time) - with Cash Wheeler
 New Japan Pro Wrestling
 IWGP Tag Team Championship (1 time, current) - with Cash Wheeler
 Pro Wrestling Illustrated
 Tag Team of the Year (2022) 
 Ranked No. 103 of the top 500 singles wrestlers in the PWI 500 in 2019
 Ranked No. 1 of the top 50 tag teams in the PWI Tag Team 50 in 2020 
 Ring of Honor
 ROH World Tag Team Championship (1 time) - with Cash Wheeler
 Sports Illustrated
 Ranked No. 8 of the top 10 wrestlers in 2022
 WWE
 WWE 24/7 Championship (1 time) – with Dash Wilder
 WWE Raw Tag Team Championship (2 times) – with Dash Wilder
 WWE SmackDown Tag Team Championship (1 time) – with Dash Wilder
 NXT Tag Team Championship (2 times) – with Dash Wilder
 First WWE Tag Team Triple Crown  Champions – with Dash Wilder
 NXT Year-End Award (2 times)
 Match of the Year (2016) – with Dash Wilder vs. #DIY (Johnny Gargano and Tommaso Ciampa) in a two-out-of-three falls match for the NXT Tag Team Championship at NXT TakeOver: Toronto
 Tag Team of the Year (2016) – with Dash Wilder
 Wrestling Observer Newsletter
 Feud of the Year (2022) 
 Tag Team of the Year (2022)

Notes 
Dawson and Dash Wilder simultaneously pinned R-Truth to become co-WWE 24/7 Champions.

References

External links 
 
 
 
 
 

1984 births
21st-century professional wrestlers
Living people
All Elite Wrestling personnel
American male professional wrestlers
East Carolina Pirates football players
People from Dare County, North Carolina
People from Whiteville, North Carolina
Professional wrestlers from North Carolina
University of North Carolina at Wilmington alumni
WWE 24/7 Champions
NXT Tag Team Champions
AEW World Tag Team Champions
ROH World Tag Team Champions
IWGP Heavyweight Tag Team Champions
AAA World Tag Team Champions